Julia Lohmann (born 1977, Germany) is a multidisciplinary designer living and working in London. She is a visiting lecturer at a number of UK design schools.

Biography

Born in Hildesheim, Germany, Julia Lohmann came to the United Kingdom in 1998 to study on the BA (Hons) Graphic Design course at the Surrey Institute of Art and Design, University College (now the University for the Creative Arts). She graduated in 2001 and won several prizes for her graphic design and product development work. She subsequently completed a two-year MA in Design Products at the Royal College of Art (RCA), London in 2004.

Upon graduation, Julia Lohmann's work was selected for the ‘Design Mart’ exhibition at the Design Museum, London, by then director Alice Rawsthorn. Since then, Lohmann's work has been shown as part of the ‘Great Brits’ touring exhibition organised by the British Council and numerous exhibitions in galleries and museums in the UK and abroad, as well as The Culture Show (BBC, 2007), in books, international magazines and newspapers.

Lohmann set up her own design studio in London in 2004.

Philosophy

Lohmann thinks that the design industry truly has power and it should not support the status quo, instead moving forward in a socially responsible and sustainable way. She is constantly asking herself questions and design is her way of figuring out how she views the world.

Some of her design focuses on animals and dead animals; concentrating on the moment when humans mentally remove themselves from an animal's death. Her goal is to break the mental gap that people have when considering what's on their plate and how it got there. Therefore, she has focused on the nastier features of the production of food in some of her work. Some examples are a ceiling made from the stomach of sheep, a gutted carcass cast in resin, vessels made from animal bones, and porcelain jewelry made by casting frozen baby mice. Her work includes a couch shaped as a headless cow, made to illustrate the use of a number of hides in making a typical couch, so that the creased parts of the cow do not show. Whether her starting point is leather or seaweed, Lohmann's interest lies in finding capabilities in materials that no one else has. She says she finds it way more challenging if a material starts as something ‘typically’ beautiful.

Works

Kelp Constructs, lighting objects made from seaweed, 2008
This project is based on the idea that dried strips of seaweed could replace typical materiality in the creation of everyday objects. This is shown in the laser-cut lampshades. They were cut and then stretched or sewed into new shapes while still wet. Lohmann thinks that seaweed is an undervalued material, and that we consume it in things like toothpaste everyday without realizing it. It could potentially be a substitute for materials such as leather and parchment, among others. She also wants to promote seaweed's use in communities that could combine the material with their local artisanship. For example, the use of kelp on fish farms as water filters could provide extra income for struggling fishing communities.

Resilience, a series of concrete and wool tables, 2008
This project was in reaction to research into man-made constructions that are conquered by nature and destroyed by humans; it's based on the effects of natural disasters on built structures. The series is a reversal of what qualities are normally associated with certain man-made and natural materials. The concrete is cast onto a wool backing and subsequently broken up. This design process harnesses the effects of deterioration and the wool holds the concrete together. The resulting series is a range of unique pieces based on a single mold.

The Catch, an installation on the over-fishing of the oceans, S-AIR/ICC, Sapporo, Japan, 2007
The Catch shows how much the ocean has been depleted by over-fishing and vast consumption of marine life. Those visiting this installation are confronted with towering waves created from empty fish boxes. The visitor is led into the core, a room also made from fishing boxes and lighted by candles held in tuna vertebrae. This piece challenges the way many assume there is a limitless supply of marine life, and the lack of action as a response of scientific research.

The Lasting Void, resin and fiberglass stool, 2007
This cast is based on the internal cavity of a calf. The reasoning was that when an animal is slaughtered, the internal organs are removed and a purposeless negative space is left. It only exists for the short period in time between when the animal becomes seen as meat.
 Erosion Series, furniture objects made of soap, 2007
 Cowbenches, leather benches in the shape of a cow's body, 2004 
 Ruminant Bloom, lights made from preserved sheep and cow stomach, 2004
 Flock, a ceiling installation made from 50 preserved sheep stomachs, 2004

Awards

 2008, 'Designer of the Future', Design Miami Basel
 2007, Artist in Residence, S-AIR/ICC, Sapporo, Japan
 2004, Esmee Fairbairn Foundation grant
 2004, Selected as a ‘Great Brit’, for the eponymous British Council touring design exhibition
 2004, 1st Prize Qatar Logo Competition, ‘Qatar Costume Museum’ identity 
 2001, 2 IF Design Award, ‘Best of Category’ for Ecology and Product Design 
 2001, Red Dot Design Award
 2001, 1st prize, D&AD student award, Product Development 
 2001, 1st prize, Inaugural John Gillard Award, Best Design Student on Show

Bibliography

 ‘Twenty-first Century Design – new design icons, from mass market to avant-garde’, Marcus Fairs (Ed.), Carlton Books, London, UK
 ‘&Fork’, (100 contemporary designers selected by 10 curators) Phaidon Press, London, UK

References

External links
 Julia Lohmann Official Website 
 Design Museum London 
 British Council 
 Esmee Fairbairn Foundation 
 Design Miami 
 Royal College of Art (RCA) 
 Design & Art Direction (D&AD) 
 Dezeen Online Design Magazine 
 IconEye Design & Architecture Magazine 
 Ethical Explorations - Design Trends 

1977 births
German designers
German women artists
Living people